Waziristāní, also known as Wazirwóla (meaning "of the Wazirs") and Wazirí, is a central Pashto dialect spoken in North Waziristan and South Waziristan. Waziristani differs in pronunciation and to a much lesser degree in grammar from the other varieties of Pashto.

The Waziristani dialect is similar to the dialect spoken around Urgun (eastern Paktika province) and the Bannuchi dialect of Bannu.

Lormier states:

Waziristani Pashto is spoken by various tribes, and it is also called Masidwola by the Mahsuds and Dāwaṛwóla by the Dāwaṛ. In the Dāwaṛi variety of Wazrisitani the word for هګۍ [haɡəɪ] is يييې [jije]. 

The standard Pashto word for "boy", "هلک" [halək], is rarely heard in Waziristani, instead, "وېړکی" [weṛkai] meaning "little one" is used [from standard: وړوکی -waṛúkai] . The word "ləshki" [ləʃki] is used instead of the standard "لږ" [ləʐ], "a little bit".

Notes
Linguist List

References

Pashto dialects
Languages of Afghanistan
Languages of Khyber Pakhtunkhwa
Waziristan